Francis Radclyffe may refer to:

Francis Radclyffe, 1st Earl of Derwentwater and 3rd Baronet (1625 – 1697)
Sir Francis Radclyffe, 1st Baronet of the Radclyffe Baronets, of Derwentwater

See also
Frances Radclyffe (disambiguation) for the female version of the name
Francis Ratcliffe, zoologist